Kelly J. Wolf (born August 3, 1961) is an American politician from the state of Alaska. He served in the Alaska House of Representatives from 2003 until 2005.

Biography
Wolf was born in 1961 in Longview, Washington, moving to Alaska in 1975, graduating from Kenai Central High School in 1979. He worked as a contractor and carpenter, and was first elected to the House of Representatives in 2002 as a Republican, defeating Hal Smalley. Wolf did not run for reelection in 2004, but ran in 2008 as an independent, placing third.

Wolf was elected to the Kenai Peninsula Borough Assembly in 2012, and was subject to an unsuccessful recall effort in January 2015, before being defeated in his 2015 bid for reelection. He also unsuccessfully ran for lieutenant governor in 2014, and attempted a comeback to the House in 2016.

Personal life
Wolf and his wife, Elvira, have 4 children: Ryan, Joshua, Justin, and Salena.

Political positions
Wolf is opposed to gun control, abortion, and same-sex marriage. Elaborating on his pro-life views, he stated in his 2014 declaration of candidacy for Lieutenant Governor, "I cannot support abortion, because if did  my oldest son who was born with Down’s Syndrome may not be here and to me and my family this would have been a tragedy."

Electoral history

References

1961 births
Living people
Members of the Alaska House of Representatives
Borough assembly members in Alaska
Alaska Independents
Alaska Republicans
People from Longview, Washington
People from Soldotna, Alaska
21st-century American politicians